Kay Matysik (born 18 June 1980, in Berlin) is a German male beach volleyball player. He competed for Germany at the 2012 Summer Olympics with team-mate Jonathan Erdmann.  They were knocked out in the last 16.  The same pair won the bronze medal at the 2013 Beach Volleyball World Championships, beating former world champions Alison Cerutti and Emanuel Rego in the bronze medal match.

References

1980 births
Living people
German men's beach volleyball players
Beach volleyball players at the 2012 Summer Olympics
Olympic beach volleyball players of Germany
Volleyball players from Berlin